Studio 60 on the Sunset Strip is an American comedy-drama television series created and primarily written by Aaron Sorkin. The series was about the production of a live comedy series, similar to Saturday Night Live. Produced by Warner Bros. Television, Studio 60 on the Sunset Strip ran on NBC for 22 episodes, from September 18, 2006, to June 28, 2007. On May 14, 2007, NBC cancelled the series after one season. It is the only one of the four television shows created by Sorkin not to air for more than one season.

Plot
The series takes place behind the scenes of a live sketch comedy show (also called Studio 60 on the Sunset Strip or Studio 60) on the fictional television network NBS (National Broadcasting System), whose format is similar to that of NBC's Saturday Night Live. The show-within-a-show is run by executive producers Matt Albie (Matthew Perry) and Danny Tripp (Bradley Whitford). Matt serves as the head writer and Danny produces the show.

Cast and crew

Studio 60 features an ensemble cast portraying the personnel involved in the production of a late-night comedy show.

Major roles
 Danny Tripp (Bradley Whitford) is a former segment producer for Studio 60 who is asked to return as showrunner/executive producer when executive producer Wes Mendell is fired. He works closely with Matt Albie, his longtime friend. He is a recovering drug addict and alcoholic.
 Matt Albie (Matthew Perry) is a former writer for Studio 60 who takes over production along with long-time friend Danny Tripp, as executive producer and head writer. He is also Harriet's ex-boyfriend.
 Jordan McDeere (Amanda Peet) is the recently hired president of entertainment programming of network National Broadcasting System, of which Studio 60 is the flagship show.
 Harriet Hayes (Sarah Paulson) is a "multi-talented" performer, a devout Christian, and one of the "Big Three" main stars of Studio 60. She is also Matt Albie's ex-girlfriend. She also dated Luke Scott, a former writer (and Matt's rival) at Studio 60, now a big-time director. The character of Harriet is partially based on Kristin Chenoweth, whom Sorkin previously dated before she worked on The West Wing.
 Tom Jeter (Nate Corddry) is another of the show's "Big Three." He is from the Midwest, and his brother is serving as an airman in the US Air Force who is deployed in Afghanistan. During the course of the show, he begins dating Lucy Kenwright, one of the staff writers.
 Simon Stiles (D. L. Hughley), the final member of the "Big Three", became an alumnus of the Yale School of Drama after a troubled youth. His original intention was to become a dramatic actor, rather than a comedian.
 Jack Rudolph (Steven Weber) is the chairman of the National Broadcasting System, and Jordan's boss. During the course of the show, he and his wife separate.
 Cal Shanley (Timothy Busfield) is the director of Studio 60. He has two children and is a military history buff. (Busfield also directed several episodes of the series, as he did for Sports Night.)

Secondary roles
 Jeannie Whatley (Ayda Field) is a member of the show's ensemble. She is Matt's occasional lover and Harriet's close friend and is a bit of a gossip on the set.
 Alex Dwyer (Simon Helberg) is a member of the show's ensemble; he is recognized as the complement to Harriet Hayes, being the premier male impressionist in the cast. He has at least one recurring sketch, The Nicolas Cage Show, in which he plays the title character, and has also portrayed Tom Cruise and Ben Stiller.
 Dylan Killington (Nate Torrence) is a rookie member of the show's ensemble. Dylan plays a number of different characters in the show-within-a-show. During "Nevada Day Part – II", Simon goes to Nevada with Tom, Danny, and Jack; Matt then asks a reluctant Dylan to fill in for Simon in News 60. He has a crush on Jeannie.
 Samantha Li (Camille Chen) is a member of the show's ensemble.
 Ricky Tahoe (Evan Handler) is a former co-executive producer of the show and former co-head of the writers' room. In "The Option Period", he and Ron leave Studio 60 to pursue a pilot show for Fox called Peripheral Vision Man – based on a character from an old Studio 60 sketch; Ricky's departure is marked by a hostile shouting match with Matt.
 Ron Oswald (Carlos Jacott) is a former co-executive producer of the show and former co-head of the writers' room. In "The Option Period", he leaves the show with Ricky to pursue a pilot show for Fox called Peripheral Vision Man – based on a character from an old Studio 60 sketch.
 Wilson White (Edward Asner) is the head of TMG (Tunney Media Group), the conglomerate that owns the NBS network.
 Lucy Kenwright (Lucy Davis) is a junior writer on the show and the only pre-Matt and Danny writer to remain after Ricky and Ron's departure. Lucy and Darius are supposed to get their first sketch on the air in "B-12". The sketch is about a bungling hostage taker, but it is cancelled when a real-life hostage-taker kills his entire family and then himself just after that evening's show starts. During the course of the show, Lucy begins dating Tom Jeter.
 Darius Hawthorne (Columbus Short) is Matt's assistant writer. Matt and Simon hire Darius after seeing his stand-up act in "The Wrap Party". During "The Harriet Dinner" he argues with Simon because Darius passed a sketch pitched by Simon to Lucy.
 Andy Mackinaw (Mark McKinney) is introduced in "B-12" after Ricky and Ron's departure when Matt needs an extra writer's help. Andy is a former writer whose tenure on Studio 60 predates Matt and Danny's initial departure. Since that time, Andy's wife and daughter have died in a car accident. Andy is very serious and has only been seen smiling once.
 Suzanne (Merritt Wever) is a former production assistant on the show who becomes Matt's assistant in the episode "B-12". She confronts Matt about his drug use in the episode "Breaking News".
 Hallie Galloway (Stephanie Childers) is the vice-president of alternative programming (a.k.a. reality TV) for NBS and has developed an adversarial relationship with Jordan. She first appears in the episode "Monday". McDeere has expressed her fear that Galloway is being groomed to take her place after the rocky start to McDeere's tenure as president of the network.
 Mary Tate (Kari Matchett) is a lawyer from law firm Gage Whitney Pace who is hired by NBS and has a sexual interest in Matt. Between "Breaking News" and "What Kind of Day Has It Been", Mary is used as a second option to get Tom's brother out of the hostage situation.
 Shelly Green (Wendy Phillips) is head of publicity for NBS.

Guest appearances
 Wes Mendell (Judd Hirsch) is the creator of Studio 60 who is fired by Jack Rudolph after going on a long on-air rant against the current state of television. Although he appears only in the pilot, Wes is referred to as a big influence on Matt and Danny.
 Martha O'Dell (Christine Lahti) is a Pulitzer Prize-winning journalist working on a story for Vanity Fair about the new leadership of Studio 60. In "The West Coast Delay" and "The Long Lead Story" she ends up easily uncovering almost every detail of the cast and crew's personal lives. Martha's character is based on the columnist Maureen Dowd, who once dated Sorkin.
 Kim Tao (Julia Ling) guest starred in five episodes ("Nevada Day Part 1," "Nevada Day Part 2," "Monday," "Harriet Dinner Part 1," "Harriet Dinner Part 2") as a viola prodigy who speaks five languages. She is the official translator for her father during the Macau deal. Kim claims to be Tom's biggest fan, and, because of this, she wants to pursue a career in improvisational comedy against her father's wishes.
 Eli Weinraub (Eli Wallach) appeared in "The Wrap Party." An old mischievous man with an interesting – and familiar – past. Wallach was nominated for an Emmy for this role.
 John Goodman as a Pahrump, Nevada judge, Robert "Bobby" Bebe, in "Nevada Day Part 1" and "Nevada Day Part 2". Goodman won an Emmy for this role.
 Kevin Eubanks appeared as himself in "The Christmas Show".
 Felicity Huffman, Lauren Graham, Allison Janney, Masi Oka, Howie Mandel, Jenna Fischer, Jason Alexander and Rob Reiner appeared as themselves as celebrity hosts in various episodes.

Production

Development
Studio 60 on the Sunset Strip was tentatively titled Studio 7 on the Sunset Strip during its development stage. The series prompted NBC and CBS to engage in an intense bidding war for the rights to the show in October 2005, with NBC agreeing to a "near-record license fee" in order to obtain the rights. It was the show most anticipated by media buyers prior to the network upfront presentations, according to MediaLife. Among the online public the show was also highly anticipated, receiving the most online "mentions" and the most positive sentiment of any new 2006 show.

Influences on the show
Sorkin drew from his own experience as a writer in creating the characters (the Harriet/Matt relationship was based on Sorkin's relationship with Kristin Chenoweth, who played Annabeth Schott on The West Wing). In Studio 60s pilot, one of the reasons that Matt and Harriet broke up was Harriet's decision to appear on The 700 Club to support her Christian music album. In 2005, Chenoweth made a similar appearance on The 700 Club, sparking a negative reaction from some of her gay fans because of the views of 700 Club host Pat Robertson. Unlike Matt and Harriet, Sorkin and Chenoweth did not work together on The West Wing. Sorkin left after The West Wings fourth season and Chenoweth joined the cast during season six.

The Jordan McDeere character was loosely based on former ABC Entertainment President Jamie Tarses, who was a consultant on the show.

The conflict between NBS and the FCC regarding uncensored language of American soldiers in Afghanistan parallels the decision by a small number of PBS affiliates to air the Oscar-nominated documentary Operation Homecoming: Writing the Wartime Experience in full, despite potentially hefty fines for unedited obscenities used by American soldiers describing their experiences in Iraq.

Following Sorkin's trend of putting real-life behind-the-scenes conflict into the writing of the show, the latter episodes of the series focus on Matt and Danny having to come up with more money for the show. The duo determine that they could raise extra money by remaking the stage as a form of product placement. This mirrors the real-world struggle of the show and its constant attempts to reduce the budget of the show and also generate more money. The new stage and its advertisements would have generated money for Studio 60, the fictional show, as well as the real life Studio 60 program. This last-ditch attempt was not enough to save the show.

Similarities to 30 Rock
Two shows debuting on 2006–07 NBC lineup, 30 Rock and Studio 60 on the Sunset Strip, revolved around the off-camera happenings on a Saturday Night Live-analogue sketch comedy series. Similarities between the two led to speculation that only one of them would be picked up. 30 Rock co-star Alec Baldwin said, "I'd be stunned if NBC picked up both shows. And ours has the tougher task, as a comedy, because, if it's not funny, that's it." Kevin Reilly, then president of NBC Entertainment, was supportive of 30 Rock creator, writer, producer and star Tina Fey, describing the situation as a "high-class problem":

Evidence of the overlapping subject matter between the shows, as well as the conflict between them, arose when Aaron Sorkin asked Lorne Michaels to allow him to observe Saturday Night Live for a week, a request Michaels denied. Despite this, Sorkin sent Fey flowers after NBC announced it would pick up both series, and wished her luck with 30 Rock. Fey said that "it's just bad luck for me that in my first attempt at prime time I'm going up against the most powerful writer on television. I was joking that this would be the best pilot ever aired on Trio. And then Trio got canceled."

Although 30 Rocks first-season ratings proved lackluster and were lower than those of Studio 60, Studio 60 was more expensive to produce. Studio 60 was canceled after one season while 30 Rock was renewed, and would ultimately last for seven seasons and 138 episodes, the last of which aired during the 2012–13 season.

Episodes
Studio 60 consists of a single season of 22 episodes. Its pilot episode was written by series creator Aaron Sorkin, and directed by executive producer Thomas Schlamme. Its pilot was ostensibly based on Sorkin and Schlamme's experience on The West Wing. Sorkin wrote or co-wrote all of the episodes. Schlamme directed four episodes, a total exceeded only by Timothy Busfield, who directed five episodes and co-directed a sixth.

The series includes two two-part episodes ("Nevada Day" and "The Harriet Dinner") and concludes with a story arc featuring a three-part episode "K & R" (kidnap & ransom) that is capped off with a fourth and final episode ("What Kind of Day Has It Been").

Reception

Critical reaction
Television critics named Studio 60 their "Best Overall New Program" in a poll conducted by Broadcasting and Cable, based on the pilot episode. In their 2006 year-end issue, the New York Daily News listed Studio 60 as number 6 on their best "Series of the Year" list, and it was also listed in best standout performances as number 9 for Matthew Perry.
Glenn Garvin of the Miami Herald named Studio 60 as number 2 on his list of best "Series of the Year." Studio 60 earned a collective rating of 75 out of 100 based on 33 reviews by TV critics and received 8.2 out of 10 from 276 votes by users on Metacritic.

The pilot was seen by an average of 13.4 million total viewers in its initial airing on NBC, although it experienced significant viewer falloff from the first half-hour to the second half-hour, and the second episode's Nielsen ratings were down by 12% from the pilot. The erosion continued through episode 5, with a 43% viewer drop off from its premiere, but subsequently leveled off.

On October 27, 2006, NBC gave a conditional "vote of confidence" by ordering three additional scripts on top of the initial order of 13. Despite the order, Studio 60 performed poorly in the ratings, which led to speculation that the network was seriously considering canceling the show.

Gossip blogger Roger Friedman of Fox News reported on October 30, 2006, that cancellation of the show was imminent. This was denied the next day by an NBC representative who stated that the show "is profitable at this point" and that rather than a cancellation, it is more likely that the show's time slot will change.

On November 9, 2006, NBC announced that the show had been picked up for a full season, citing its favorable demographics as the reason. According to NBC's press release: "Studio 60 has consistently delivered some of the highest audience concentrations among all primetime network series in such key upscale categories as adults 18–49 living in homes with $75,000-plus and $100,000-plus incomes and in homes where the head of household has four or more years of college."

In its December 17, 2006, issue, Time listed Studio 60 as one of "5 Things That Went From Buzz to Bust", sharing the distinction with other "phenomena that captivated the media for a spell, then turned out to be less than huge." Entertainment Weekly named Studio 60 the worst TV show of 2006. Comedy writers were largely disdainful of Studio 60, with comments like "People in television, trust me, are not that smart", "[Sorkin] wants to get big ideas across and change people's minds. No comedians work that way. They go for the laughs first and the lesson second", and "[Saturday Night Live] is so dark, they could never show what actually happens there."

The New Yorker described the short-lived Studio 60 on the Sunset Strip as a show people loved to hate-watch, as "it was bad in a truly spectacular way—you could learn something from it, about self-righteous TV speechifying and failed satire and the dangers of letting a brilliant showrunner like [Aaron] Sorkin run loose to settle all his grudges in fictional form".

On July 19, 2007, the Academy of Television Arts & Sciences announced their nominations for the 2007 Primetime Emmy Awards. Studio 60 was nominated in five categories. The pilot episode earned three nominations: Outstanding Directing (Thomas Schlamme), Outstanding Cinematography for a Single-Camera Series, and Outstanding Casting in Dramatic Series. Both John Goodman and Eli Wallach were nominated Outstanding Guest Actor in Dramatic Series. Studio 60 Emmy nominations surpassed several other shows, such as Friday Night Lights and Dexter, which got two and three, respectively. The show also tied with CSI and 24.

U.S. scheduling
On December 2, 2006, NBC announced that Studio 60 would be sharing the Monday at 10 p.m. timeslot with The Black Donnellys; as a result, Studio 60 was on hiatus from December 4, 2006, to January 22, 2007. It then ran non-stop until February 26, 2007, when it was scheduled to take another hiatus.

On February 13, 2007, NBC announced that Studio 60 would go on hiatus one week early, and that the last episode would air on February 19, 2007. This was at least partially due to the show's delivering its lowest ratings to date on the Monday preceding the announcement.

During the hiatus on NBC, The Black Donnellys (premiered February 26), Thank God You're Here (premiered April 9), The Real Wedding Crashers (premiered April 23, after Thank God You're Here moved to Wednesdays), and Law & Order: Criminal Intent (aired its last two episodes of the season starting May 14) occupied the Monday 10 p.m. time period.

On April 2, 2007, NBC announced that Studio 60 would not reclaim its Monday at 10 p.m. time slot at the conclusion of The Black Donnellys run and that The Real Wedding Crashers, a reality show based on the popular movie, would occupy the timeslot from April 23, 2007, through the end of the TV season. However, on April 26, NBC announced that Studio 60 would return from its hiatus on Thursday, May 24, at 10:00 p.m.

Studio 60 was canceled on May 11, 2007, during the NBC upfront presentation.

After cancellation
In a 2011 reference to the cancelled Studio 60, Aaron Sorkin appeared in "Plan B", a fifth-season episode of 30 Rock; he played himself, depicted as looking for work alongside an also-struggling Liz Lemon. He refers to his achievements, such as The West Wing and The Social Network, but when Liz Lemon mentions Studio 60, he quickly replies, "Shut up!" During the March 2012 promotion of Bent, an NBC romantic comedy series starring Amanda Peet, Peet commented on what the issue was with Studio 60, saying it was "too expensive and there was too much anticipation. I guess all together we seemed like this arrogant monolith, but individually, none of us felt very arrogant."

Television ratings

U.S. ratings
Weekly rankings based on Fast National ratings.

Key: Rating is the estimated percentage of all TVs tuned to the show, share is the percentage of all TVs in use that are tuned in. Viewers is the estimated number of actual people watching, in millions, while ranking is the approximate ranking of the show against all prime-time TV shows for the week (Monday through the following Sunday).

While the show premiered with high ratings, there was a large drop during the second half. This trend continued through nearly every episode of the show.

Seasonal ratings
Seasonal rankings (based on average total viewers per episode) of Studio 60 on the Sunset Strip on NBC:

DVR ratings
On December 29, 2006, Nielsen Media Research reported the results of having, for the first time, monitored viewers who use a Digital Video Recorder to pre-record shows for later viewing. According to the Nielsen numbers, adding these viewers increased Studio 60'''s ratings the most in percentage terms of all network shows. These ratings, called "live plus seven", include all viewers who use a DVR to record the show and then watch it within a week of its initial airing.

According to Nielsen, Studio 60 added nearly 11%, or almost a million viewers, to its total every week as a result of these "live plus seven" viewers.

According to Medialife Magazine, "The live-plus-seven-day rating for NBC's Studio 60 on the Sunset Strip is 136% higher than its live rating in DVR homes."

Awards

Wins
2006
 Broadcasting and Cable pool — Best Overall New Program.
2007
 Banff World Television Festival — Continuing Series – for the episode "Pilot."
 Emmy Awards — Outstanding Guest Actor in a Drama Series – John Goodman

Nominations
2006
 Satellite Awards — Outstanding Actor in a Series, Drama – Matthew Perry
 Satellite Awards — Outstanding Actor in a Series, Drama – Bradley Whitford
 Satellite Awards — Outstanding Actress in a Series, Drama – Amanda Peet
 Satellite Awards — Outstanding Actress in a Series, Drama – Sarah Paulson
2007
 Emmy Awards — Outstanding Directing for a Drama Series: Pilot, directed by Thomas Schlamme
 Emmy Awards — Outstanding Cinematography for a Single-Camera Series: Pilot
 Emmy Awards — Outstanding Casting for a Drama Series
 Emmy Awards — Outstanding Guest Actor in a Drama Series – Eli Wallach
 Writers Guild of America Awards — Best Overall New Program
 Writers Guild of America Awards — Episodic Drama – for the episode "Pilot", written by Aaron Sorkin
 Directors Guild of America Awards — Outstanding Directorial Achievement in Dramatic Series, Night: for the episode "Pilot", directed by Thomas Schlamme
 Golden Globe Awards — Best Performance by an Actress in a Supporting Role in a Series, Mini-Series or Motion Picture Made for Television – Sarah Paulson
 Art Directors Guild — Excellence in production design single camera television series – for the episode "Pilot", Production Design by Carlos Barbosa
 American Society of Cinematographers — episodic television – Thomas Del Ruth
 ICG Publicists Awards — Outstanding Television Series

Home media
DVD release
On June 27, 2007, the day before the airing of the show's final episode, Warner Home Video announced an October 16 release date for the Studio 60 on the Sunset Strip: Complete Series DVD set.

Alternative availability
NBC made the pilot episode of Studio 60 available on DVD to Netflix subscribers on August 5, 2006. The DVD also includes the pilot episode for Kidnapped, another show which aired on NBC in the fall and also got canceled. AOL also premiered the first episode of Studio 60 in its entirety on its online television channel.

The pilot episode was screened to the general public for the first time at the 31st MediaGuardian Edinburgh International Television Festival, a British industry and media event held annually over the August bank holiday weekend (August 25–27, 2006). The pilot episode was screened outdoors on a "giant billboard style screen" in Conference Square, next to the Edinburgh International Conference Centre.

References

External links

 
 
 
 Studio 60 on the Sunset Strip'' on BuddyTV.com
 New Yorker review
 

2000s American comedy-drama television series
2006 American television series debuts
2007 American television series endings
English-language television shows
Fictional television shows
NBC original programming
Television series about television
Television series by Warner Bros. Television Studios
Television series created by Aaron Sorkin
Television shows set in Los Angeles
Metafictional television series
Television series about show business